Einhell Germany AG is a German manufacturer of power tools and electrical garden equipment in Landau an der Isar, Germany.

History
It was founded on June 2, 1964 by Josef Thannhuber as Hans Einhell GmbH. Hans Einhell was the uncle of Josef Thannhuber.

In the late 1960s it opened a factory in Spain. The company floated on the stock market in 1987. It is a Prime Standard traded company on Xetra (EING_p.DE).

Structure

It has around 1,400 employees. In 2016 it turned over €486 million. Andreas Kroiss has been their Chief Executive since January 2003.

In 2013, it took over Ozito an Australian company supplying Bunnings DIY products for their store all over Australia.

Einhell UK is situated in Birkenhead in the Wirral, on the Champions Business Park.

Products

References

External links
 Einhell Worldwide

Chainsaws
Companies based in Bavaria
Garden tool manufacturers
German brands
Lawn mower manufacturers
Manufacturing companies established in 1964
Power tool manufacturers
Tool manufacturing companies of Germany
Vacuum cleaner manufacturers